Espostoopsis is a monotypic genus of cactus containing the single species Espostoopsis dybowskii. The generic name is formed from Greek opsis meaning "view", referring to its resemblance to the genus Espostoa, with which it is often confused. The plant is only known from northern Bahia, Brazil.

Synonymy
The genus Espostoopsis has been brought into synonymy with Gerocephalus F.Ritter.

References

Trichocereeae
Cacti of South America
Endemic flora of Brazil
Flora of Bahia
Cactoideae genera
Monotypic Cactaceae genera
Vulnerable flora of South America